Omer Michael Blaes (born April 30, 1961) is an American astrophysicist. He is a professor of physics at University of California, Santa Barbara.

Early life and education 
Blaes was born April 30, 1961. He completed a BSc with first class honors in astrophysics at Queen Mary University of London in August 1983. He earned a MPhil in physics, cum laude, from the International School for Advanced Studies (SISSA) in October 1985. He completed a PhD in physics at SISSA in September 1986. Blaes' dissertation was titled The Stability of Thick Accretion Disks. Blaes was the Chaim Weizmann Research Fellow in Theoretical Physics at California Institute of Technology from October 1, 1986, to September 30, 1989. He was a research associate at the Canadian Institute for Theoretical Astrophysics from October 12, 1989, to August 31, 1993.

Career 
On September 1, 1993, Blaes became an assistant professor in the department of physics at University of California, Santa Barbara (UCSB). He became an associate professor in 1998 and a professor at UCSB on July 1, 2004. Blaes served as chair of the UCSB physics department from July 1, 2010, to June 30, 2013. His research focuses on theoretical astrophysics (X- and gamma-ray astronomy) and compact objects (white dwarfs, neutron stars, and black holes). Much of his work in astrophysics focuses on the physics of accretion on black holes. He has looked at magneto rotational instability (MRI) and MRI turbulence in the innermost parts of accretion disks.

Omer oversees the outlist of the committee for sexual-orientation and gender minorities in astronomy in the American Astronomical Society.

Personal life 
Blaes came out as gay at the age of 28 while he was a postdoctoral researcher in Toronto. Blaes was married to his husband before the 2008 California Proposition 8.

References

External links
 

Living people
1961 births
American astrophysicists
University of California, Santa Barbara faculty
Alumni of Queen Mary University of London
Gay academics
Gay scientists
American LGBT scientists
20th-century American physicists
21st-century American physicists
20th-century American astronomers
21st-century American astronomers
Place of birth missing (living people)